Dana Hall School is an independent boarding and day school for girls in grades 5-12 located in Wellesley, Massachusetts. Founded in 1881 by Henry F. Durant, Dana Hall originally served as Wellesley College's preparatory program.

Notable alumnae
Princess Aisha bint Al Hussein (1986), princess of Jordan
Busty Heart, entertainment personality 
María Corina Machado, Venezuelan activist and politician
Dorcas Brigham (1914), botanist and horticulturist
Margaret Wise Brown (1928), children's author including Goodnight Moon
Rosario Ferré (1956), author, contributing editor of The San Juan Star, and former First Lady of Puerto Rico
Helen Hartness Flanders (1909), folklorist
Nina Garcia (1983), fashion director at Elle magazine, judge on Project Runway, and author
Ange Kagame, First Daughter of Rwanda
Opal Kunz (1914), aviator
Lila Mayoral, former First Lady of Puerto Rico
Alley Mills, actress
Sharon Olds (1960), Pulitzer Prize-winning poet
Madelyn Renee, soprano opera singer
Hillary Bailey Smith (1976), Daytime Emmy-winning soap opera actress
Frances Simpson Stevens (1911), painter associated with the Futurist movement
Karen Stives (1968), gold and silver equestrian medalist at the 1984 Olympics
Alexandra Wentworth (1983), actress and comedian
Latanya Sweeney (1977), computer scientist known for her work in data privacy
Fatima Jafri (2004), Tech lawyer leading social impact products at Meta

See also 
 Pine Manor College

References

External links
Official website
The Association of Boarding Schools profile

Boarding schools in Massachusetts
Educational institutions established in 1881
Girls' schools in Massachusetts
Schools in Norfolk County, Massachusetts
Wellesley, Massachusetts
Private high schools in Massachusetts
Private middle schools in Massachusetts
1881 establishments in Massachusetts